Mata Hambre is a sector in the city of Santo Domingo in the Distrito Nacional of the Dominican Republic.

References 

Populated places in Santo Domingo